Eupithecia bifasciata is a moth in the  family Geometridae. It is found in Panama and Brazil.

References

Moths described in 1900
bifasciata
Moths of Central America
Moths of South America